Rob Landsbergen (25 February 1960 – 29 September 2022) was a Dutch footballer who played as a forward for PSV Eindhoven and South Korean Hyundai Horangi. He was the first Dutch football player to play for a Korean club. 

Landsbergen died from complications of Alzheimer's disease on 29 September 2022, at the age of 62.

Career statistics

Honors
PSV
 President's Cup: 1983

Individual
 K League Top Assists Award: 1984

References

 PSV Record

External links
 

1960 births
2022 deaths 
Deaths from Alzheimer's disease
Dutch footballers
Association football forwards
Eredivisie players
Eerste Divisie players
K League 1 players
PSV Eindhoven players
Willem II (football club) players
NAC Breda players
Helmond Sport players
Ulsan Hyundai FC players
Dutch expatriate footballers
Dutch expatriate sportspeople in South Korea
Expatriate footballers in South Korea